Shahrak-e Safi Khani (also Romanized as Shahrak-e Şafī Khānī) is a village in Bakan Rural District, Hasanabad District, Eqlid County, Fars Province, Iran. At the 2006 census, its population was 358, in 78 families.

References 

Populated places in Eqlid County